Formula One Championship Edition is a racing video game developed by Studio Liverpool and published by Sony Computer Entertainment exclusively for PlayStation 3.

Background
The game follows the basic structure of Formula One 06 for the PlayStation 2 and PlayStation Portable. The main differences include the updated visuals for the PS3 including a lot more detail, Sixaxis compatibility, real time reflections, car reflections on wet circuits and new wet weather effects. Early in development the safety car was to be included in the game for the first time in an F1 game since Formula One 99 for the PlayStation but was removed before the final release along with the PSP wing mirror integration shown at E3.

The game also boasts dynamic weather, and improved AI. The AI system is called "Live Action Racing" where one can pressure the opposition, causing them to make little mistakes such as running wide on corners, causing them to crash into other cars or spin off the road of their own accord. The AI will then try to seek opportunities to pass the player in a realistic manner.

The game is based on the early 2006 Formula One World Championship. Hence, Yuji Ide drives for Super Aguri when in reality he lost his super licence just 4 races into the '06 Formula One World Championship, and Franck Montagny, then later Sakon Yamamoto took his seat. Other minor changes throughout the real 2006 Formula One World Championship are also not represented, therefore Pedro de la Rosa, Robert Kubica. Robert Doornbos, Franck Montagny and Sakon Yamamoto are not featured. Also, the Midland team are not re-branded as Spyker in later Grands Prix in the game.

In the career mode, players begin by running tests for one of three teams (Toro Rosso, Super Aguri or Midland F1) at either the Silverstone, Magny Cours or Catalunya circuits. The tests given vary between the teams. When the player successfully completes the tests, they are given the role of test driver or race driver, depending on how well the player performed in the test. After performing well as a test driver, the player will become the second driver of the team. From there the player can compete in race weekends through many different roles. As a test driver the player will try out different car settings in practice, and as a driver the player will have track position targets to meet to keep the seat. The player's performances are subject to review at several points during the season.

The initial release did not include force feedback support, which is considered by many to be an important feature for simulation racing games used with driving wheel controllers. A subsequent update in early 2008 added force feedback. The game also lacks support for 1080i or 1080p output resolutions. Per the calendar, the Belgian Grand Prix is not included.

Gameplay
Formula One Championship Edition follows the 2006 Formula One World Championship, with 18 tracks, 11 teams and 22 drivers. Driver changes that happened during the real 2006 Formula One World Championship are also not included, such as Juan Pablo Montoya leaving McLaren after the United States Grand Prix and replaced by Pedro de la Rosa and Jacques Villeneuve leaving BMW Sauber after the German Grand Prix and replaced by Robert Kubica.

Release
Formula One Championship Edition was released in North America on February 27, 2007. It was the first Formula One game to be released there since 2003, when Atari released Grand Prix Challenge exclusively for PlayStation 2 and EA Sports released F1 Challenge '99-'02 for the PC, and F1 Career Challenge for the PlayStation 2, Xbox and Nintendo GameCube. It was a launch title for the European and Australasian release of the PlayStation 3.

Formula One Championship Edition was the final release in Sony's series of F1 games which had been running for over a decade, with the announcement that Codemasters had secured exclusive rights to the sport following shortly after the game's release. As this game was effectively an update of the PlayStation 2 and PlayStation Portable game Formula One 06, there was to be no 2007 version of the game - the first time the series had skipped a season since 1996.

This was the most recent F1 game given the three-season gap before Sumo Digital's F1 2009 (published by Codemasters) game came out on PSP and Nintendo Wii. In September 2010, Codemasters released F1 2010 with all the official teams and tracks, available on PS3, Xbox 360 and PC.

Reception

The game received "average" reviews according to the review aggregation website Metacritic. In Japan, Famitsu gave it a score of 30 out of 40.

411Mania gave it an eight out of ten and called it "high-octane fun. With deep customization and an intriguing season that will leave gamers feeling satisfied. The racing itself feels smooth and natural as you slide through each turn. With graphics I could stare at all day and fun that doesn’t get old, this may just be the game that brings Formula One racing to the forefront". The Sydney Morning Herald gave it three stars out of five and said: "If you are an F1 purist, you will discover a comprehensive and challenging simulation that offers long-term appeal". The Detroit Free Press gave it two stars out of four, writing: "How well can you follow a big green line? The game shows you the shortest distance around the track -- a green line to follow. The line turns briefly red when you come to a turn, but don't ease up on the throttle, because the game slows your vehicle down for you. How boring is that?"

References

External links
 

2006 video games
Formula One video games
Multiplayer and single-player video games
PlayStation 3 games
PlayStation 3-only games
Psygnosis games
Sony Interactive Entertainment games
Sports video games set in the United States
Video games developed in the United Kingdom
Video games set in Bahrain
Video games set in Brazil
Video games set in Canada
Video games set in China
Video games set in France
Video games set in Germany
Video games set in Hungary
Video games set in Indiana
Video games set in Italy
Video games set in Japan
Video games set in Malaysia
Video games set in Monaco
Video games set in Shanghai
Video games set in Spain
Video games set in Turkey
Video games set in the United Kingdom